Vondo is a rural locality (a settlement) in Rakhinskoye Rural Settlement, Sredneakhtubinsky District, Volgograd Oblast, Russia. The population was 28 as of 2010.

Geography 
Vondo is located 52 km northeast of Srednyaya Akhtuba (the district's administrative centre) by road. Rakhinka is the nearest rural locality.

References 

Rural localities in Sredneakhtubinsky District